"Bye Bye Boyfriend" is Fefe Dobson's first single, taken from her first album, Fefe Dobson. The Canadian single version has "Stupid Little Love Song" as the B-side. "Bye Bye Boyfriend" was included as the B-side of her CD single "Take Me Away".

Track listing
 "Bye Bye Boyfriend" (Fefe Dobson, Jay Levine, James Bryan McCollum) — 4:14
 "Stupid Little Love Song"

Charts

Music video 
The music video shows Dobson performing on a stage with her band and taking revenge on her boyfriend. It was directed by Vale George and produced by Mark Hesselink and Gregory Hergott.

Awards and nominations

References 

Fefe Dobson songs
Songs written by Fefe Dobson
2003 songs
Island Records singles
2003 debut singles
Songs written by Jason Levine
Songs written by James Bryan McCollum